The 2007 South American Championships in Athletics were held at the Estádio Ícaro de Castro Mello in São Paulo, Brazil from 7 June to 9 June 2007. A total of 44 events were contested, of which 22 by male and 22 by female athletes.
Continuing in their traditional dominant role, the hosts Brazil easily topped both the medal and points tables, having won 28 gold medals and 61 medals in total. The next best team was Colombia who had a haul of seven golds and 26 overall, while Argentina took third with 13 medals of which 4 were gold.

In addition to the seven Championship records which were broken during the three-day event, two South American records were broken: Keila Costa jumped 14.57 m in the women's triple jump while Fábio Gomes da Silva broke the men's pole vault record with a clearance of 5.77 m. A total of thirteen national records in athletics were broken by medal winning athletes.

Lucimar de Moura of Brazil was the stand out performer in the medals, winning the 100/200 metres double before taking the national team to a gold in the 4×100 metres relay. Felipa Palacios of Colombia took three silver medals in the same events, finishing behind de Moura each time, and also won silver in the 4×400 metres relay. Germán Lauro won both the men's shot put and discus throw events while Elisângela Adriano completed the same feat on the women's side. Hugo Chila won silver in the long jump and triple jump, and Keila Costa scored a long jump silver as well as her triple jump gold. In one of the more dramatic moments of the championships, Rosibel García looked set to complete an 800/1500 metres double but she fell in the last 50 m of the 800 m race, allowing 1500 m silver medallist Marian Burnett of Guyana to win the gold.

Records

Medal summary

Men

Women

Medal table

Points table

Totals are calculated by awarding a country points for each time an athlete finishes in the top six of an event.

Participation
According to an unofficial count, at least 249 athletes from 13 countries participated.

 (39)
 (5)
 (73)
 (29)
 (34)
 (18)
 (2)
 (4)
 (5)
 (10)
 (2)
 (5)
 (23)

See also
2007 World Championships in Athletics
2007 in athletics (track and field)

References

External links

South American
South American Championships in Athletics
Athletics
South American
2007 in South American sport
International athletics competitions hosted by Brazil